This article lists events occurring in Mexico during 2023. It lists the most important political leaders during the year at both federal and state levels and will include a brief year-end summary of major social and economic issues. Cultural events, including major sporting events, are also listed.

Incumbents

President and cabinet
 President: Andres Manuel López Obrador 

 Interior: Olga Sánchez Cordero
 Foreign Affairs: Marcelo Ebrard
 Treasury: Arturo Herrera
 Economy: Tatiana Clouthier Carrillo
 Environment: Maria Luisa Albores
 Tourism: Miguel Torruco Marqués
 Civil Service: Irma Sandoval-Ballesteros
 Health: Jorge Alcocer Varela
 Development: Román Meyer Falcón
 Welfare: Javier May Rodríguez
 Culture: Alejandra Frausto Guerrero
 Defense: Luis Cresencio Sandoval
 Navy: José Rafael Ojeda Durán
 Security: Alfonso Durazo Montaño
 Attorney General: Alejandro Gertz Manero

Supreme Court

 President of the Supreme Court: Arturo Zaldívar Lelo de Larrea

Governors

LXIV Legislature of the Mexican Congress

President of the Senate
Olga Sánchez Cordero

President of the Chamber of Deputies
Sergio Gutiérrez Luna

Events

January
 1 January - Ten prison officers and four to seven inmates are killed in an armed attack on a prison in Ciudad Juárez, Chihuahua, in which 24-30 prisoners escaped.
 3 January - Five gunmen and two security force members are killed during a gun battle while searching for 30 inmates who escaped two days ago during the Juárez prison attack.
 5 January - The army arrests Ovidio Guzmán López, the son of incarcerated drug lord Joaquín "El Chapo" Guzmán, in Culiacán, Sinaloa. Unrest ensues in the state, with schools and airports closed. Ten soldiers, a police officer and 19 cartel members are killed.
 7 January - One person is killed and dozens of others are injured when two trains crash on Line 3 of the Mexico City Metro in Mexico City.

February 

 28 February - Nuevo Laredo military shooting: Soldiers open fire on a pickup truck carrying unarmed civilians in Nuevo Laredo, Tamaulipas, killing five people, sparking protests and riots by local people.

Predicted and scheduled events
 14 October - An annular solar eclipse will be visible in the Western U.S., Mexico, Central America, Colombia, and Brazil and will be the 44th solar eclipse of Solar Saros 134.

Sports

Association football
2022–23 Liga MX season
2022–23 Liga MX Femenil season

Deaths

January
5 January – Ernesto Alfredo Piñón de la Cruz, 33, criminal (Los Mexicles).
10 January – Black Warrior, 54, professional wrestler (CMLL).
23 January - Polo Polo, 78, comedian.

See also
 Outline of Mexico
 Index of Mexico-related articles
 History of Mexico

References

Footnotes

Citations

External links

 
Mexico
Mexico
2020s in Mexico
Years of the 21st century in Mexico